Neoascia carinicauda is a species of hoverfly in the family Syrphidae.

Distribution
Kazakhstan, Russia.

References

Eristalinae
Insects described in 1955
Diptera of Asia
Taxa named by Aleksandr Stackelberg